The Mixed Doubles tournament of the 2014 Asian Junior Badminton Championships was held from February 19–23 in Taipei, Taiwan. The defending champion of the last edition were the South Korean pair Choi Sol-kyu and Chae Yoo-jung. Last year bronze medalist, and standing in the top seeds Huang Kaixiang and Chen Qingchen of China emerge as the champion after beat the second seeded from South Korea Kim Jung-ho and Kong Hee-yong in the finals with the score 21–14, 21–13.

Seeded

  Huang Kaixiang / Chen Qingchen (champion)
  Kim Jung-ho / Kong Hee-yong (final)
  Dechapol Puavaranukroh / Chanisa Teachavorasinskun (third round)
  Chua Khek Wei / Peck Yen Wei (second round)
  Ryan Ng Zin Rei / Elaine Chua Yi Ling (third round)
  Hashiru Shimono / Wakana Nagahara (quarter-final)
  Po Li-wei / Chang Ching-hui (third round)
  Lee Chia-han / Lee Chia-hsin (quarter-final)

Draw

Finals

Top Half

Section 1

Section 2

Section 3

Section 4

Bottom Half

Section 5

Section 6

Section 7

Section 8

References

External links 
Main Draw

Mixed
Asia Junior